Haloid may refer to:

 The Haloid Photographic Company, now known as Xerox Corporation
 Haloid, an animation by Monty Oum published on GameTrailers in 2007